The List of Newport County A.F.C. seasons is a collection of results from all seasons played by the club from 1912 to the present day.

Key

Key to league record
P – games played
W – games won
D – games drawn
L – games lost
F – goals for
A – goals against
Pts – points
Pos – final position

Key to cup rounds
DNP – did not participate
NH – not held
PRE – preliminary round
QR1 – first qualifying round
QR2 – second qualifying round
QR3 – third qualifying round
QR4 – fourth qualifying round, etc.
R1 – first round
R2 – second round
R3 – third round
R4 – fourth round
QF – quarter-finals
SF – semi-finals

Key to divisions
D2 – Football League Second Division
D3 – Football League Third Division
D3S – Football League Third Division South
D4/L2 – Football League Fourth Division/Football League Two
Conf – Football Conference
Conf S – Football Conference South
SLP – Southern League Premier Division
SLM – Southern League Midland Division
SLS – Southern League Southern Division
SLW – Southern League Western Division
SL1 – Southern League First Division
SL2 – Southern League Second Division
Hell – Hellenic League

Division shown in bold when it changes due to promotion or relegation.

References 

 Football Club History Database
 Amber in the Blood: A History of Newport County.

External links 
 Official Newport County A.F.C. website

 
English football club seasons
Welsh football club seasons